Lake Metelys is located in southern Lithuania's Alytus County. The lake, covering 1,292 hectares, has a maximum depth of 15 metres. It lies with the boundaries of Meteliai Regional Park. Lake Metelys formed from melted ice lump.

The lake is a notable waterfowl habitat; populations of great crested grebes, greylag goose, and the globally near-threatened ferruginous duck have been observed there.

References

Metelys
Tourist attractions in Alytus County